Zhu Yu may refer to:

Zhu Yu (artist) (born 1970), controversial modern Chinese artist
Zhu Yu (author), Chinese author of the medieval Song Dynasty
Zhu Yu (footballer) (born 1997),Chinese footballer